Werrington is a civil parish in the district of Staffordshire Moorlands, Staffordshire, England. It contains seven listed buildings that are recorded in the National Heritage List for England. All the listed buildings are designated at Grade II, the lowest of the three grades, which is applied to "buildings of national importance and special interest".  The parish contains the village of Werrington and the surrounding area.  The listed buildings consist of three farmhouses, a larger house and its lodge, a stone post that possibly once marked a boundary, and a milepost.


Buildings

References

Citations

Sources

Lists of listed buildings in Staffordshire